Lifland is a surname. Notable people with the surname include:

Burton Lifland (died 2014), American judge
John C. Lifland (born 1933), American judge